Cokoviće is a village situated in Novi Pazar municipality, Raška District in Serbia.

References

Populated places in Raška District